Club Social y Deportivo La Florida, mostly known as La Florida is an Argentine football club from La Florida y Luisiana in Tucumán Province. The team currently plays in the regional competition of the Province, the Liga Tucumana de Fútbol.

Titles
 Torneo Argentino B (1): 2002–03.
 Liga Tucumana de Fútbol (2): 2002, 2014.

References

External links
Liga Tucumana de Fútbol 

 
Association football clubs established in 1917
1917 establishments in Argentina